The 2007 NBA Finals was the championship series of the National Basketball Association's (NBA) 2006–07 season and conclusion of the season's playoffs. In this best-of-seven playoff series, the Western Conference champion San Antonio Spurs defeated the Eastern Conference champion Cleveland Cavaliers in a 4–0 sweep. This was Cleveland's first trip to the NBA Finals in their franchise history and San Antonio's fourth. Tony Parker was named the series' MVP. The series was televised on ABC under the ESPN on ABC branding, and produced the lowest television ratings in NBA Finals history until 2020.

This series was the last sweep in the NBA Finals until 2018, which coincidentally also involved the Cavaliers on the losing end. This also was the last finals until 2019 in which a team made its first trip to the NBA Finals in its franchise history.

Format
The Finals were played using the 2-3-2 format, where the first two and last two games are held at the team with home court advantage. The NBA, after experimenting in the early years, restored this original format for the Finals in 1985. The other playoff series were played in the 2-2-1-1-1 format.

The best-of-seven series began on June 7, 2007, with the Western Conference champion San Antonio Spurs playing the Eastern Conference champion Cleveland Cavaliers. Because the San Antonio Spurs had a better regular season win–loss record, they had home court advantage.

Series summary

Background

2007 NBA Playoffs

Regular season series
The Cleveland Cavaliers won both games in the regular season series:

San Antonio Spurs

The previous season saw the San Antonio Spurs drop a heartbreaking seventh game at home to the rival Dallas Mavericks in the second round. As the new season began, the Spurs saw the Mavericks rolling through their regular season, on their way to a franchise best 67 win campaign. Meanwhile, the Spurs struggled through their season through January. With the main focus lying on Dallas and the Phoenix Suns, the Spurs found themselves flying under the radar. A late-season surge resulted in a 58–24 regular season record, good enough for third seed in the Western Conference.

In the playoffs, the Spurs met the Denver Nuggets and their duo of Allen Iverson and Carmelo Anthony. The Nuggets took game 1, but the Spurs reeled off 4 straight wins to take the series in five games. As San Antonio prepared to face off against the second seed Suns, the top-ranked Mavericks suffered a stunning first-round exit at the hands of the Golden State Warriors. With the Mavericks gone, the stakes of the Suns-Spurs series shot up dramatically, and it was a closely competitive and controversial series.

The Suns had homecourt advantage, but that did not last past game 1. In a hotly contested battle of Western Conference heavyweights, each team tried to deliver a knockout blow. The Spurs finally landed it, but by accident. With the game in the balance Tony Parker and Steve Nash collided head-to-head. A large gash opened along Nash's nose and the medical staff could not stop the bleeding. He was forced to sit out the final 45 seconds and watch the Spurs win, 111–106. Game 2 saw the Suns rebound and blow out the Spurs, 101–81. After this game, Suns center Amar'e Stoudemire called the Spurs a dirty team. Game 3 switched back to San Antonio and saw a return of physical play, with Manu Ginóbili receiving a bruised and bloodied eye and Bruce Bowen kneeing Nash in the groin. Tim Duncan led the Spurs to a 108–101 victory.

Games 4 and 5 were the most controversial of the series. The Spurs, after being comfortably in control of game 4, saw their 11-point fourth-quarter lead dwindle away to a 2-point Suns lead. With 18 seconds left, Robert Horry bodychecked Nash into the scorers' table. Nash's teammates jumped to his defense; during the ensuing altercation, Stoudemire and Boris Diaw left the bench. Their action violated NBA rules, and league commissioner David Stern suspended both players for game 5. Horry was also suspended two games for his flagrant foul on Nash. In game 5, in Phoenix, the short-handed Suns jumped out early to a 16-point lead, but in a reversal of game 4, the Spurs came back in the final seconds and won the game 88–85, giving San Antonio a 3–2 series lead.

The Spurs won game 6 of the series 114–106 in San Antonio, sending them to their fifth Western Conference finals since 1999.

San Antonio went on to beat the Utah Jazz in five games to advance to the franchise's fourth NBA Finals.

Cleveland Cavaliers

In the replay of the previous year's playoffs with the Cavaliers holding home court advantage against Washington Wizards, the Cavaliers swept the Wizards after the season-ending injuries of both Gilbert Arenas and Caron Butler. In the second round of the playoffs, the Cavaliers faced the New Jersey Nets. Again, the Cavaliers had home court advantage, and battled the Nets through 6 games before winning the series. The Cavaliers advanced to the conference finals for only the third time in franchise history, and faced a familiar foe: the Detroit Pistons, the number one seed in the Eastern Conference, with their home court advantage. This was the same Detroit team that knocked the Cavaliers out of the second round the previous year. Expectations were high after a 7-game series the previous year and the two teams did not disappoint.

The first two games were close and saw Cleveland fall by identical 79–76 scores. Down 0–2 in the series, the spotlight shifted back to Cleveland and LeBron James. Another hard-fought set ensued, with the Cavaliers taking the two games at home 88-82 and 91-87 respectively. Game 5 switched back to Detroit and produced one of the greatest moments in NBA history.

With 6:14 to go in regulation and his team clinging to a one-point 79–78 lead, James took over the game. He scored 11 of the final 12 points to end regulation tied 91-91. In the first overtime, James scored all nine of the Cavaliers' points, ending the period tied 100-100. In the second overtime, James again scored all nine of the team's points to win, 109-107. Thus, in the last 16:14 of play, James scored 29 of the Cavaliers' last 30 points, as well as all of their last 25 points.

The Cavaliers beat the Pistons at home in Game 6 of the Eastern Conference finals to earn the franchise's first trip to the NBA Finals. Cleveland became the third team in NBA history to win a best-of-seven conference finals series after trailing by 2 games.

Rosters

San Antonio Spurs

Cleveland Cavaliers

Player statistics

San Antonio Spurs

|-
| align="left" |  || 4 || 0 || 10.6 || .364 || .400 || .000 || 1.5 || 0.5 || 0.3 || 0.0 || 3.0
|-
| align="left" |  || 4 || 4 || 41.7 || .296 || .389 || .250 || 5.5 || 1.3 || 0.5 || 0.3 || 6.0
|-
| align="left" |  || 4 || 4 || 37.3 || .446 || .000 || .625 || 11.5 || 3.8 || 1.3 || 2.3 || 18.3
|-
| align="left" |  || 4 || 0 || 11.4 || 1.000 || .000 || .800 || 2.5 || 0.0 || 0.3 || 0.0 || 4.0
|-
| align="left" |  || 4 || 4 || 18.5 || .261 || .083 || .667 || 2.0 || 0.8 || 1.3 || 0.0 || 3.8
|-
| align="left" |  || 4 || 0 || 29.3 || .367 || .435 || .833 || 5.8 || 2.5 || 1.3 || 0.0 || 17.8
|-
| align="left" |  || 4 || 0 || 22.0 || .333 || .375 || .750 || 4.5 || 3.3 || 0.3 || 1.3 || 3.0
|-
| align="left" |  || 4 || 4 || 20.8 || .471 || .000 || .333 || 4.3 || 0.5 || 0.3 || 0.0 || 4.3
|-! style="background:#FDE910;"
| align="left" |  || 4 || 4 || 37.8 || .568 || .571 || .526 || 5.0 || 3.3 || 0.8 || 0.0 || 24.5
|-
| align="left" |  || 2 || 0 || 0.6 || .000 || .000 || .000 || 0.0 || 0.0 || 0.0 || 0.0 || 0.0
|-
| align="left" |  || 4 || 0 || 10.1 || .571 || .000 || .000 || 1.3 || 1.0 || 0.0 || 0.0 || 2.0

Cleveland Cavaliers

|-
| align="left" |  || 1 || 0 || 0.0 || .000 || .000 || .000 || 0.0 || 0.0 || 0.0 || 0.0 || 0.0
|-
| align="left" |  || 4 || 2 || 34.8 || .439 || .316 || 1.000 || 1.8 || 2.5 || 1.5 || 0.0 || 10.8
|-
| align="left" |  || 4 || 4 || 27.5 || .500 || .000 || .875 || 8.3 || 0.3 || 0.3 || 0.5 || 12.8
|-
| align="left" |  || 2 || 2 || 21.9 || .100 || .000 || .000 || 2.5 || 1.0 || 0.5 || 0.0 || 1.0
|-
| align="left" |  || 4 || 4 || 25.8 || .351 || .000 || .833 || 10.3 || 0.5 || 0.5 || 1.0 || 7.8
|-
| align="left" |  || 4 || 4 || 42.6 || .356 || .200 || .690 || 7.0 || 6.8 || 1.0 || 0.5 || 22.0
|-
| align="left" |  || 4 || 0 || 16.2 || .455 || .556 || 1.000 || 1.3 || 1.0 || 0.0 || 0.0 || 4.5
|-
| align="left" |  || 4 || 0 || 15.3 || .313 || .182 || .750 || 2.3 || 1.3 || 0.8 || 0.0 || 3.8
|-
| align="left" |  || 1 || 0 || 10. || .000 || .000 || .000 || 1.0 || 0.0 || 0.0 || 0.0 || 0.0
|-
| align="left" |  || 4 || 4 || 31.7 || .364 || .417 || .333 || 2.5 || 0.8 || 0.5 || 0.0 || 9.8
|-
| align="left" |  || 1 || 0 || 0.9 || .000 || .000 || .000 || 0.0 || 0.0 || 0.0 || 0.0 || 0.0
|-
| align="left" |  || 4 || 0 || 10.2 || .400 || .000 || .500 || 1.0 || 2.3 || 0.3 || 0.3 || 1.3
|-
| align="left" |  || 4 || 0 || 24.5 || .667 || .000 || .625 || 5.3 || 0.8 || 1.3 || 0.5 || 7.5

Game summaries
All times are in Eastern Daylight Time (UTC−4). If the venue is located in a different time zone, the local time is also given.

Game 1
The Cleveland Cavaliers entered the 2007 Finals as newcomers. Game 1 was their first NBA Finals game in franchise history, and the first for each of its players (other than reserve point guard Eric Snow). However, the San Antonio Spurs had been to the Finals in three of the past eight seasons, winning a championship each time. With solid performances by Tim Duncan, Tony Parker, and Manu Ginóbili, the Spurs won the series opener in convincing fashion, limiting LeBron James to 14 points on 4–16 shooting.

Game 2
The Spurs took a stranglehold on momentum in Game 2. The Spurs' big three overwhelmed the Cavs and the Spurs led by as many as 29 points in the third quarter. They dominated the game during the first 3 quarters and played show-time basketball. A furious 25–6 rally by Cleveland in the final quarter wasn't enough as the Spurs took a 2–0 lead in the series.

Game 3
Rookie Daniel Gibson started Game 3 in place of the injured Larry Hughes but scored a series-low 2 points on 1-10 shooting. As a team the Cavs shot only .367, but out-rebounded the Spurs 48–41. Zydrunas Ilgauskas had a 2006–07 season high 18 rebounds. On the game's final play, LeBron James missed a potential game-tying 29 foot 3-pointer.

Game 3 was the lowest scoring Finals game since 1955, with Tim Duncan of the Spurs having his lowest scoring game in his NBA Finals career, with 14 points.

Game 4
San Antonio started out strong through the first three quarters, leading by as many as 11. Cleveland would stage a rally near the end of the third quarter and the first five minutes of the fourth, scoring 14 consecutive points to take its first second-half lead of the series. However, the Spurs would stage a 12–3 rally of their own to retake the lead and win the series in a 4–0 sweep.

Twelve-year veteran Michael Finley was awarded the NBA championship game ball.

Broadcasting

Coverage was produced by ESPN and televised on ABC in the United States, TSN in Canada, Sky Sports in the United Kingdom, Canal+ in France, Premiere in Germany, and more than 100 other broadcasters in over 200 countries.

Play-by-play announcer Mike Breen, analysts Mark Jackson & former Rockets head-coach Jeff Van Gundy, and courtside reporters Michele Tafoya & Stuart Scott provided commentary and analysis for the North American market. The radio coverage on ESPN Radio features play-by-play man Mike Tirico and color analysts Dr. Jack Ramsay and Hubie Brown.

This was the first of a record 14 NBA Finals assignments for the team of Breen, Jackson and Van Gundy. (In the 2022 NBA Finals, Mark Jones alongside Mark Jackson called Game 1 of the series with Breen and Van Gundy out due to COVID-19 protocols; Van Gundy returned in Game 2 followed by Breen in Game 3.)

The featured song, aired throughout the playoffs, was The Pussycat Dolls "Right Now."

Another song featured in the 2007 NBA Finals series, "It Ends Tonight" by The All-American Rejects, was aired at the end of the pre-game promo for Game 4.

Ratings

According to ESPN, the NBA Finals series was a television bust in the United States. San Antonio's four-game sweep of Cleveland finished with a record-low 6.2 television rating and 11 share on ABC, Nielsen Media Research said on June 15, 2007.

San Antonio's series-winning 83-82 victory on Thursday night got a 6.5/12, down 17 percent from the 7.8/14 for Game 4 in 2006.

Despite having the lowest ratings of any NBA championship series, game two of the 2003 series between San Antonio and New Jersey remains the lowest-rated game of all time in the history of the NBA Finals.

Aftermath
The Spurs won 56 games in the succeeding 2007–08 season, but relinquished the Southwest Division title to the New Orleans Hornets due to a tie-breaker. The Spurs had the last laugh, though, defeating the Hornets in seven games. But their chance of defending their title was denied by the Los Angeles Lakers in five games of the conference finals. After that, age and injury took its toll on the Spurs, as they proceeded to win only a single playoff series in three years (2010, vs. Dallas 4–2 of the first round), before getting upset by the Memphis Grizzlies in the first round of the 2011 NBA Playoffs despite finishing with 61 wins.

The Spurs split the two Finals meetings against the Heat.

The Cavaliers won 45 games in the 2007–08 season, despite early-season contract issues involving center Anderson Varejão and guard Sasha Pavlović, and a mid-season trade for Ben Wallace. They fell in the second round to the eventual NBA champions Boston Celtics in seven games, after a hard-fought duel involving LeBron James and Paul Pierce. The Cavaliers would earn the league's best record for the next two years (66 and 61 wins, respectively) and boast the NBA's MVP in James. However, they were unable to win it all, losing to the Orlando Magic in six games of the 2009 Eastern Conference Finals and the Celtics in six games of the 2010 Eastern Conference Semifinals (allowing the Lakers to win the Finals twice against the Magic and Celtics). The latter playoff defeat would cost head coach Mike Brown his job, though he was later re-hired (and fired again) in the 2013–14 NBA season.

The Cavaliers then appeared in the NBA draft lottery four consecutive times, earning the top pick in three of them. Those three top picks became Kyrie Irving (2011), Anthony Bennett (2013) and Andrew Wiggins (2014) (Bennett and Wiggins were later traded to Minnesota for Kevin Love). In July 2014, James announced his return to the Cavaliers after the hiring of coach David Blatt, and they reached the conference finals against the Atlanta Hawks with a 4-0 sweep before falling to the Golden State Warriors in the Finals 4-2. The following season, the Cavaliers returned to the Finals in a rematch against the Golden State Warriors and won the Finals over the Warriors 4-3 with LeBron James winning the Finals MVP.

References

External links

National Basketball Association Finals
Finals
2000s in Cleveland
21st century in San Antonio
2007 in sports in Ohio
2007 in sports in Texas
National Basketball Association controversies
Basketball competitions in San Antonio
Basketball competitions in Cleveland
NBA
NBA
June 2007 sports events in the United States